Coprophanaeus is a genus of Scarabaeidae or scarab beetles.

Species
 Coprophanaeus abas (MacLeay, 1819) 
 Coprophanaeus acrisius (MacLeay, 1819) 
 Coprophanaeus bellicosus (Olivier, 1789) 
 Coprophanaeus bonariensis (Gory, 1844) 
 Coprophanaeus boucardi (Nevinson, 1891) 
 Coprophanaeus callegarii Arnaud, 2002 
 Coprophanaeus caroliae Edmonds, 2008 
 Coprophanaeus cerberus (Harold, 1875) 
 Coprophanaeus chiriquensis (Olsufieff, 1924) 
 Coprophanaeus christophorowi (Olsufieff, 1924) 
 Coprophanaeus conocephalus (Olsufieff, 1924) 
 Coprophanaeus corythus (Harold, 1863) 
 Coprophanaeus cyanescens (Olsufieff, 1924) 
 Coprophanaeus dardanus (MacLeay, 1819) 
 Coprophanaeus degallieri Arnaud, 1997 
 Coprophanaeus ensifer (Germar, 1821) 
 Coprophanaeus gamezi Arnaud, 2002 
 Coprophanaeus gephyra Kohlmann & Solís, 2012
 Coprophanaeus gilli Arnaud, 1997 
 Coprophanaeus horus (Waterhouse, 1891) 
 Coprophanaeus ignecinctus (Felsche, 1909) 
 Coprophanaeus jasius (Olivier, 1789) 
 Coprophanaeus lancifer (Linnaeus, 1767)
 Coprophanaeus magnoi Arnaud, 2002 
 Coprophanaeus milon (Blanchard, 1846) 
 Coprophanaeus morenoi Arnaud, 1982 
 Coprophanaeus ohausi (Felsche, 1911) 
 Coprophanaeus parvulus (Olsufieff, 1924) 
 Coprophanaeus pecki Howden & Young, 1981 
 Coprophanaeus pertyi (Olsufieff, 1924) 
 Coprophanaeus pessoai (Pereira, 1949) 
 Coprophanaeus pluto (Harold, 1863) 
 Coprophanaeus punctatus (Olsufieff, 1924) 
 Coprophanaeus saphirinus (Sturm, 1826) 
 Coprophanaeus solisi Arnaud, 1997 
 Coprophanaeus spitzi (Pessôa, 1934) 
 Coprophanaeus suredai Arnaud, 1996 
 Coprophanaeus telamon (Erichson, 1847)
 Coprophanaeus thalassinus (Perty, 1830)

References

Scarabaeidae genera